The National Amphitheatre was a boxing stadium and entertainment venue at 73–75 Castlereagh Street, Sydney, New South Wales. Rebuilt as a theatre for vaudeville productions by the Fuller brothers, it was refurbished and renamed several times.

History
Jim Brennan's  National Sporting Club hall on Castlereagh Street, near King Street, was reopened on 20 November 1906 as "Brennan's National Amphitheatre" for a fight between Mike Williams of South Africa and Billy McCall.

In 1912 Brennan and Ben and John Fuller merged their interests, and the venue became Brennan and Fuller's National Amphitheatre, specialising in lower-class vaudeville acts, in competition with the more expensive offerings of Harry Rickards' Tivoli circuit. In 1915 the Fuller brothers bought out Brennan's interest.

In 1917 it was closed for renovation and reopened for Fuller as Vaudeville Theatre or National Theatre. By 1922 it had been renamed Fullers' New Theatre.

It reopened as Fuller's Roxy Theatre on 28 February 1930, then renamed the Mayfair Theatre in March 1932. and became "Hoyts Mayfair" in 1942.
The Mayfair Theatre closed in 1979 and the building was demolished in 1984.

References 

Former theatres in Sydney
Demolished buildings and structures in Sydney
Buildings and structures demolished in 1984